British Tar may refer to:

British Tar or Jack Tar, a nickname for a sailor
British Tar (ship), several ships
"A British Tar", a song from Gilbert and Sullivan's 1878 operetta, H.M.S. Pinafore
British Tar Products, a company distilling coal tar